Louis Bruce Farmstead Historic District, also known as Rock Enon Farm, is a historic home and farm and national historic district located near Russellville, Moniteau County, Missouri.   The district encompasses six contributing buildings and one contributing structure associated with a late-19th century farmstead.  They are the house (1872-1876), a smokehouse / multipurpose building (c.1870-76), a privy (c. 1870-1876), a spring house (1873), a granary (c. 1870-1876), a substantial barn (1870), and a stone retaining wall with a swinging iron gate and carriage steps. The house is a 2 1/2-story, five bay, central hall I-house constructed of limestone blocks.  It has a gable roof and a three-bay front porch.

It was listed on the National Register of Historic Places in 1992.

References

Historic districts on the National Register of Historic Places in Missouri
Farms on the National Register of Historic Places in Missouri
Buildings and structures in Moniteau County, Missouri
National Register of Historic Places in Moniteau County, Missouri